Labeo nandina is a species of fish in the genus Labeo which is found in north-eastern India, Bangladesh and Myanmar.

References 

Labeo
Fish described in 1822